Tonga McClain is an American boxer.

McClain attended Park High School. He was a member of the D'Alie Boxing Club.

McClain competed at the 1989 World Amateur Boxing Championships, winning the bronze medal in the lightweight event.

References

External links 

Place of birth missing (living people)
Year of birth missing (living people)
American male boxers
Lightweight boxers
AIBA World Boxing Championships medalists